The JH24 was a Formula One car built and raced by the AGS team for the 1989 Formula One season.
It was powered by the Ford Cosworth DFR engine. The car only managed to qualify for one race. The cars were driven by Gabriele Tarquini and Yannick Dalmas, who replaced Joachim Winkelhock in the middle of the 1989 season.

Race history

1989
The car was built to replace the JH23, but in its debut in the British Grand Prix, it failed to qualify. At first, the JH24 was only used by Tarquini until the Belgian Grand Prix, where a chassis was also available for Dalmas.
In the second half of the season, the team had to prequalify - a task that was nearly never achieved by either Tarquini or Dalmas. AGS then finished 15th in the Constructors' Championship, equal with the Lolas used by the Larrousse team.

1990
A revised version of the car was entered in the first two races of the season. The car, being entered without a "B" suffix, ran with a revised suspension and enabled Dalmas to qualify for the 1990 Brazilian Grand Prix in last place, with a 3.8-second gap from the pole lap set by Ayrton Senna. Dalmas then retired on lap 28 with a suspension problem.
The car was then replaced by the JH25.

Complete Formula One results
(key) (results in bold indicate pole position)

References

External links 
Profile at ChicaneF1
AGS F1 chassis listing

AGS Formula One cars